Zafferani is a surname. Notable people with the surname include:

Andrea Zafferani (born 1982), Sammarinese politician
Grazia Zafferani (born 1972), Sammarinese politician
Rosa Zafferani (born 1960), Sammarinese politician
Tommaso Zafferani (born 1996), Sammarinese footballer